The Congress of the State of Durango is the unicameral legislative branch of the government of the Mexican State of Durango. The Congress is the governmental deliberative body of  Baja California, which is equal to, and independent of, the executive.

The Congress is unicameral and consists of 25 deputies. Deputies are elected to serve for a three-year term.

The Congress convenes in Durango City, the capital city of the state of Durango.

See also
List of Mexican state congresses

External links
Official website

Congress of Durango
Government of Durango
Durango
Durango
Durango City